The ARS rocket family was a series of rockets developed by the American Interplanetary Society — later the American Rocket Society — during the 1930s. Based on the German Mirak rocket, it used a liquid-fueled rocket engine, powered by liquid oxygen and gasoline propellants. The first successful launch, of the ARS-2, took place on May 14, 1933. The design was modified and refined by successive rockets; the last launch of an ARS rocket took place on May 9, 1937.

References

Experimental rockets of the United States